General Sir Havelock Hudson,  (22 June 1862 – 25 December 1944) was a British Indian Army officer who was General Officer Commanding 8th Division during World War I.

Military career

Hudson was commissioned into the Northamptonshire Regiment as a lieutenant on 22 October 1881. He transferred to the Indian Staff Corps in 1885 and became an officer of the 19th Lancers from that year.

Promoted to captain on 22 October 1892, he served on the staff during the North West Frontier campaign in 1897. He briefly acted as deputy assistant quartermaster-general at Indian army headquarters June–August 1900, then was appointed a staff officer in the China Field Force for the Boxer Rebellion later that year. In 1901 he took part in the second Miranzai expedition in 1901.

He commanded the 19th Lancers from 4 February to 27 August 1910.

He was appointed a General Staff Officer Grade 1 with the Directorate of Staff Duties and Military Training on 1 July 1910.

He was appointed Commandant of the Cavalry School at Sangor in India 1 July until 30 September 1912 and became Brigadier-General on the General Staff of the Northern Army on 1 October 1912.

He served in World War I as Brigadier-General on the General Staff of the Indian Corps from 1914, then was appointed General Officer Commanding (GOC) of the 8th Division on the Western Front from 31 July 1915 (in which capacity he led the attack on Ovillers losing 5,400 men) until 8 December 1916 and was appointed Adjutant General, India from 5 Feb 1917 until 30 October 1920. Following the Amritsar massacre in 1919 it fell to Hudson, in his capacity as Adjutant-General, to tell Brigadier Reginald Dyer that he was relieved of his command. He went on to be General Officer Commanding-in-Chief, the Eastern Army in India on 1 November 1920 before retiring in 1924.

In retirement he was a member of the Council of India.

References

|-

|-
 

1862 births
1944 deaths
Knights Grand Cross of the Order of the Bath
Knights Commander of the Order of the Indian Empire
Northamptonshire Regiment officers
People educated at Reading School
Indian Army cavalry generals of World War I
Indian Staff Corps officers
British military personnel of the Boxer Rebellion
British Indian Army generals